Monroe County is a county located in the Eastern Pennyroyal Plateau region of the U.S. state of Kentucky. Its county seat is Tompkinsville. The county is named for President James Monroe. It is a prohibition or dry county.

History
Monroe County is the only county of the 3,144 in the United States named for a President where the county seat is named for his Vice-President. The county was formed in 1820; and named for James Monroe the fifth President, author of the Monroe Doctrine. The county seat was named for Daniel Tompkins. They both served from 1817 to 1825.

Confederate Gen. John Hunt Morgan's first Kentucky raid occurred here on July 9, 1862. Morgan's Raiders, coming from Tennessee, attacked Major Thomas J. Jordan's 9th Pennsylvania Cavalry at USA garrison. Raiders captured 30 Union soldiers and destroyed tents and stores. They took 20 wagons, 50 mules, 40 horses, sugar and coffee supplies. At Glasgow they burned supplies, then went north, raiding 16 other towns before returning to Tennessee. 

President Abraham Lincoln's half third cousin, Thomas Lincoln (1780–1844), lived in the Meshack Creek area of present-day Monroe County and served two terms as constable of Cumberland County in 1802 and 1804. In 1810 he left Kentucky and migrated to Ohio and Indiana. In 1799 he married Patsy Gee from Meshack Creek.

Home of the Old Mulkey Meetinghouse State Historic Site. The  park features the oldest log meetinghouse in Kentucky, built in 1804 during a period of religious revival. Many Revolutionary War soldiers and pioneers, including Daniel Boone's sister, Hannah, are buried there. The structure has twelve corners in the shape of a cross and three doors, symbolic of the Holy Trinity. The Old Mulkey Church, originally called the Mill Creek Baptist Church, was established by a small band of pioneer Baptists from North and South Carolina and led by Philip Mulkey. The site became part of the park system in 1931.

Geography

Adjacent counties
 Barren County  (northwest)
 Metcalfe County  (northeast)
 Cumberland County  (east)
 Clay County, Tennessee  (southeast)
 Macon County, Tennessee  (southwest)
 Allen County  (west)

Demographics

As of the census of 2000, there were 11,756 people, 4,741 households, and 3,380 families residing in the county. The racial makeup of the county was 95.57% White, 2.76% Black or African American, 0.13% Native American, 0.01% Asian, 0.03% Pacific Islander, 0.93% from other races, and 0.59% from two or more races.  1.45% of the population were Hispanic or Latino of any race.

There were 4,741 households, out of which 31.10% had children under the age of 18 living with them, 57.40% were married couples living together, 10.40% had a female householder with no husband present, and 28.70% were non-families. 26.30% of all households were made up of individuals, and 12.60% had someone living alone who was 65 years of age or older. The average household size was 2.45 and the average family size was 2.94.

In the county, the population was spread out, with 23.90% under the age of 18, 8.90% from 18 to 24, 27.70% from 25 to 44, 24.30% from 45 to 64, and 15.30% who were 65 years of age or older. The median age was 38 years. For every 100 females there were 94.20 males. For every 100 females age 18 and over, there were 91.00 males.

The median income for a household in the county was $22,356, and the median income for a family was $27,112. Males had a median income of $21,820 versus $17,783 for females. The per capita income for the county was $14,365. About 20.00% of families and 23.40% of the population were below the poverty line, including 27.60% of those under age 18 and 30.30% of those age 65 or over. The county has long been a "persistent poverty" county as defined by the Appalachian Regional Commission.

Communities

Cities
 Fountain Run
 Gamaliel
 Tompkinsville (county seat)

Unincorporated communities
 Akersville
 Alexander
 Boyd
 Bugtussle
 Center Point
 Coe
 Coon’s Foot
 Cyclone
 Emberton
 Flippin
 Gum Tree
 Hestand
 Jeffrey
 Lamb
 Meshack
 Mount Hermon
 Mud Lick
 Otia
 Persimmon
 Raydure
 Rockbridge
 Stringtown
 Sulphur Lick
 Vernon

Politics
Located on the overwhelmingly Unionist eastern Pennyroyal, which was too hilly to have large plantations with many slaves, Monroe County was staunchly opposed to secession during the Civil War, and has remained strongly Republican ever since. The last Democrat to carry Monroe County at a Presidential level was George B. McClellan in 1864, and since at least 1896 no Democrat has managed to reach 40 percent of the county's vote. Underlining how Republican the county is, Franklin D. Roosevelt did no better than 38 percent in his four successful bids for president, and actually polled two points lower in 1936 (while winning 46 out of 48 states) than he did in 1932. Lyndon Johnson's 1964 landslide is the last time a Democrat passed 30 percent. However, factional splits among the county's Republicans, beginning in the 1970s, have led to the election of a few Democrats and independents. The county has produced two members of Congress, Tim Lee Carter and James Comer.

See also

 National Register of Historic Places listings in Monroe County, Kentucky

References

External links
 MonroeCounty.KY.gov
 Monroe County Online
 The Kentucky Highlands Project

 
Kentucky counties
Counties of Appalachia
1820 establishments in Kentucky
Populated places established in 1820